Margie is an unincorporated community in Koochiching County, Minnesota, United States; located near Big Falls.

The community is located between Northome and Big Falls on U.S. Highway 71.

Dinner Creek flows through the community. Margie is located within the Pine Island State Forest.

Geography
Margie is located near the boundary line between South Koochiching Unorganized Territory and Northwest Koochiching Unorganized Territory.

Nearby places include Big Falls, Northome, and Mizpah.

Margie is located nine miles southwest of Big Falls and 22 miles northeast of Northome. Margie is 29 miles southwest of Littlefork and 48 miles southwest of International Falls.

History
Margie was a station of the Northern Pacific Railroad.  A post office was established in November 1903, and named for the daughter of postmaster Westley Horton, the post office being located in their store.  It was located at a site on high land between two swamps.  There were several stores and a sawmill.  The original post office operated until 1985.

References

 Rand McNally Road Atlas – 2007 edition – Minnesota entry
 Official State of Minnesota Highway Map – 2011/2012 edition
 Mn/DOT map of Koochiching County – Sheet 1 – 2011 edition

Unincorporated communities in Koochiching County, Minnesota
Unincorporated communities in Minnesota